The Yamal Peninsula is located in the Yamalo-Nenets Autonomous Okrug of northwest Siberia, Russia. It extends roughly 700 km (435 mi) and is bordered principally by the Kara Sea, Baydaratskaya Bay on the west, and by the Gulf of Ob on the east. At the northern end of this peninsula lie the Malygina Strait and, beyond it, Bely Island. Across the river lies the Gyda Peninsula. In the language of its indigenous inhabitants, the Nenets, "Yamal" means "End of the Land".

The Yamal peninsula is inhabited by a multitude of migratory bird species. The well-preserved remains of Lyuba, a 37,000-year-old mammoth calf, were found by a reindeer herder on the peninsula in the summer of 2007. The animal was female and was determined to be one month old at the time of death.

Geography

The peninsula consists mostly of permafrost ground and there are numerous lakes of thermokarst origin, the biggest of which are Neito and Yambuto in the central part.

Many hydrocarbon fields have been discovered on the Yamal Peninsula, including large gas fields. The main hydrocarbon resources are concentrated in the permeable Aptian-Cenomanian complex.

Reindeer husbandry 
According to anthropologist Sven Haakanson, the Yamal peninsula is the place within the Russian Federation where traditional large-scale nomadic reindeer husbandry is best preserved. Nenets and Khanty reindeer herders hold about half a million domestic reindeer.

Development 

The area is largely undeveloped, but work is ongoing with several large infrastructure projects, including a gas pipeline and several bridges. Yamal holds Russia's biggest natural gas reserves. The 572 km Obskaya–Bovanenkovo railway, completed in 2011, is the northernmost railway in the world. Russian gas monopolist Gazprom had planned to develop the Yurkharovskoye gas field by 2011–2012. The peninsula's gas reserves are estimated to be 55 trillion cubic meters (tcm). Russia's largest energy project in history, known as the Yamal project, puts the future of nomadic reindeer herding at considerable risk.

Yamal craters

In 2014, Yamal was the discovery site of a distinct sinkhole, or pingo, which quickly drew the attention of world media. The sinkhole appeared to be the result of a huge explosion and several hypotheses were suggested to explain the formation of the crater, including a hit by a meteorite or a UFO, or the collapse of an underground gas facility.

A spokesperson for the Yamal branch of the Emergencies Ministry said, "We can definitely say that it’s not a meteorite.". Cryovolcanism has been pointed out as the most probable cause in recent researches.

The 60-meter (66-yard) crater is believed by a senior researcher from the Scientific Research Center of the Arctic, Andrei Plekhanov, in remarks to the Associated Press, to be likely the result of a "buildup of excessive pressure" underground because of warming regional temperatures in that portion of Siberia. Tests conducted by Plekhanov's team showed unusually high concentrations of methane near the bottom of the sinkhole.

The destabilization of gas hydrates containing huge amounts of methane gas is believed to have caused the craters on the Yamal Peninsula.

As of 2015, the Yamal peninsula had at least five similar craters.

Another crater appeared in August 2020.

Offshore methane leaks
According to researchers at Norway's  (CAGE), through a process called geothermal heat flux, the Siberian permafrost, which extends to the seabed of the Kara Sea, a section of the Arctic Ocean between the Yamal Peninsula and Novaya Zemlya, is thawing. According to a CAGE researcher, Aleksei Portnov:

Methane is leaking in an area of at least 7500 m2.

See also
Yamal cuisine
Gyda Peninsula

References

External links
Ялмал, статья ЭСБЕ 
Статья БСЭGreat Soviet Encyclopedia 
Yamal Culture 
Article on Nenets culture, religion and history 

Peninsulas of Russia
Landforms of Yamalo-Nenets Autonomous Okrug